WVRI (90.9 MHz) is a non-commercial FM radio station licensed to Clifton Forge, Virginia, and serving Alleghany County, Virginia.  It is owned by Liberty University and it simulcasts a Christian Contemporary radio format, known as "The Journey," from parent station WRVL Lynchburg.

WVRI is a Class B station, with an effective radiated power (ERP) of 1,000 watts.  The transmitter is off Airport Road in Hot Springs.

History

This station received its original construction permit from the Federal Communications Commission on May 23, 2008.  Before it went on the air, it was given the call sign KCFF by the FCC on February 6, 2009.  This assignment, likely by accident, made KCFF the only call sign beginning with a "K" in the Commonwealth of Virginia and one of only a handful east of the Mississippi River.  On October 15, 2009, KCFF became WVRI, under new ownership.

The station's construction permit was originally owned by Ron Elmore Ministries, Inc., but never made it to the airwaves. The construction permit and station license were sold to Liberty University in October 2009.

References

External links
 The Journey Online
 

2011 establishments in Virginia
Contemporary Christian radio stations in the United States
Radio stations established in 2011
Alleghany County, Virginia
Liberty University
VRI